Dr. Spencer Reid is a fictional character on the CBS crime drama Criminal Minds, portrayed by Matthew Gray Gubler. Reid is a genius with an IQ of 187 and can read 20,000 words per minute with an eidetic memory. He is the youngest member of the FBI Behavioral Analysis Unit (BAU), has three BAs and three PhDs (in Mathematics, Chemistry and Engineering), and specializes in statistics and geographic profiling.

Background
Spencer Reid was born on October 28 1981, in Las Vegas to William Reid (Taylor Nichols), a lawyer, and Diana Reid (Jane Lynch), a former professor of 15th century literature. Diana has paranoid schizophrenia and went off her medication during her pregnancy with Spencer. Reid and his mother have a very close relationship despite her condition.

Reid is a genius and autodidact. He has an IQ of 187, an eidetic memory, and can read 20,000 words per minute. He holds B.A.s in Psychology, Sociology, and Philosophy. He also has Ph.D.s in Chemistry, Engineering, and Mathematics, obtained from Caltech.

At age four, Spencer was approached by pedophile Gary Michaels (Andrew Herlander) while playing chess at a local park. Although Spencer was unharmed, Diana insisted the family move because she believed her son was in danger. Shortly thereafter, Spencer's six-year-old neighbor, Riley Jenkins, was raped and murdered. Diana told Lou Jenkins (Brian Goodman), Riley's father, about the park incident. Diana then followed Jenkins and witnessed him beat Michaels to death with a baseball bat. When she approached him she slipped therefore getting blood on her clothes. In order to protect his wife, William burned Diana's clothes, which Spencer inadvertently witnessed. Jenkins avoided arrest because Michaels "disappeared", and as he had a criminal history as a sexual predator, the police didn't look very hard into the case. Years later, Reid starts having nightmares about the incident, initially leading him to believe his own father was Riley's killer. BAU Supervisory Special Agents David Rossi (Joe Mantegna) and Derek Morgan (Shemar Moore) helped him investigate. After undergoing hypnotherapy to recover his memories, Reid mistakenly believes he saw his father burning his own bloody clothes, not Diana's. He pursues his father as a suspect, even after it becomes clear that Michaels is the more likely perpetrator. Michaels' body is found, and DNA confirms his killer was Lou Jenkins, who is arrested. While Reid is interviewing Jenkins, demanding to know how his father was involved, his parents interrupt and confess to their son the whole story.

When Reid was 10 years old, William abandoned the family. The Michaels incident had already started the rift, and as Diana's mental state continued to deteriorate, William left, refusing to take Spencer with him. He moved 10 miles away, and never contacted his son. Reid finds out his father's address from Jenkins 17 years later, as well as the fact that his father never changed jobs. William later states that the reason he never returned was because he was too ashamed, and felt too much time had passed for him to re-enter Reid's life, although he did keep electronic tabs on his son. When his father was leaving, young Spencer tried to convince him to stay by using a statistic that children of parents who remain together receive more education. This angered William: "We're not statistics." Reid states that one way he gets back at his father is to collect more educational degrees.

Due to his young age and genius IQ, Reid was a victim of severe bullying in high school. In "Elephant's Memory", he recounts one instance where he was stripped naked and tied to a goalpost in front of other students, remaining there for hours and when he got home his mother was having another schizophrenic episode and didn't notice he was late. In "L.D.S.K.", BAU Supervisory Agent Aaron Hotchner (Thomas Gibson) is forced to kick Reid in order to allow him access to a gun in order to shoot a suspect. When Hotchner says he is sorry if he hurt him, Reid points out that he was a child prodigy in a Las Vegas public school – implying that he had suffered worse – and tells Hotchner, "You kick like a nine-year-old girl". Reid's social standing as a child increased when he started winning games as the coach of his high school's basketball team, using statistics to break down the opposing teams' shooting strategies.

At age 12, Reid graduated from high school. He attended Caltech, where he rode his bike to classes. He finished his undergraduate degree at 16, and received his first doctorate (in Mathematics) the following year. It has also been stated that he attended MIT, but episode writer Breen Frazier admitted the MIT line was a mistake, although it was never corrected onscreen. Yale University was Reid's "safety school". Between the ages of 17 and 21, he completed two more doctorates (Chemistry and Engineering), and two more bachelor's degrees (psychology and sociology).

When Reid was 18, he realized his mother's condition had deteriorated to the point where she could no longer take care of herself. He reluctantly had her committed to a psychiatric institution, Bennington Sanitarium. Diana still resides in the same institution, and Reid says that he sends her letters every day, in part because of the guilt he feels for not visiting her. He worries about the fact that his mother's illness can be passed on genetically; telling Morgan: "I know what it's like to be afraid of your own mind".

Currently, Reid resides in an apartment in the District of Columbia, possibly near the Van Ness-UDC Metro stop.

Gubler decided that Reid's middle name is Walter, but this was never mentioned in the show and is not canon. Nevertheless, Gubler tweeted, "in celebration of the first day back on CM season 8 I am inventing reid facts. Spencer Reid's middle name is Walter".

Personality
It is suggested by other people within and outside of the team that Reid is on the autism spectrum, it is confirmed by The Fisher King in Season 1 Episode 22 through to Season 2 Episode 1. He is socially awkward and has a hard time dealing with his emotions. He often fixates on things and misses social cues (for example, unknowingly changing the subject of a conversation). The Unknown Subject ("Unsub") in (Season 1, Episode 5) "Broken Mirror" is the first person to mention this.

Reid is a technophobe, using neither email nor iPads. Gubler tweeted that Reid is also germaphobic. In general, Reid dislikes shaking hands, and becomes visibly uncomfortable when touched by strangers. 

Reid is a poor shot with his service pistol, as seen in "L.D.S.K." Upon failing his annual firearms qualification despite Hotchner's efforts to tutor him, he is relieved of his weapon and has to work unarmed during the team's newest case. Later, while being held at gunpoint by murderer Phillip Dowd (Timothy Omundson), Reid grabs Hotchner's backup Glock 26 pistol and kills Dowd with a headshot. He jokes to Hotchner afterward that he had been aiming for Dowd's leg, and Hotchner returns Reid's weapon and considers him to have qualified.

Reid carried a Glock handgun for the first three seasons but from season four and onward, he began carrying a Smith & Wesson Model 65 as he fares better using a revolver.

Reid is good at map reading and therefore does the geographic profiling and map-related activities for the team. He also has a talent with words and is the team's go-to linguistic profiler, as well as their unofficial discourse analyst. He is rarely seen behind the wheel – one time when Morgan hands him the keys, Agents Jennifer "JJ" Jareau (A.J. Cook) and Emily Prentiss (Paget Brewster) exchange horrified expressions – but in "Lo-Fi" he is seen getting into the driver's side of a vehicle and even driving that same vehicle in one scene, as well as driving to BAU Unit Chief Jason Gideon's (Mandy Patinkin) cabin in "In Name and Blood", and in "Nelson's Sparrow". However, he is usually seen as a backseat passenger during car scenes, and he commutes to work using the Metro, and presumably the Virginia Railway Express.

Storylines

Behavioral Analysis Unit
Reid joined the FBI when he was 20 years old. While there was "no psychological exam or test the FBI could put in front of him he could not ace inside of an hour", he did struggle with the more physical aspects of his job, and ultimately received waivers for those requirements. Even after a year in the field, Reid still struggles to pass his firearm qualifications. He is often left behind during arrests, has never given chase, and jokes that it is Morgan's job to kick down the doors. This does not bother the team, because while he has shown an ability to physically disarm suspects, his true talent is psychologically disarming them by forming airtight profiles.

Profiling is the only profession Reid ever considered, and he was groomed specifically for the BAU. Upon graduation from the academy, he was placed in the BAU at age 22, and given the title Supervisory Special Agent. His first case in the field was serial killer Brian Matloff (Eric Lange), the "Blue Ridge Strangler".

Gideon is Reid's closest confidant on the team during the first two seasons, and often serves as a mentor to Reid. Gideon's sudden departure from the FBI after a case gone wrong affects Reid deeply. Reid tries playing all possible chess moves in order to understand Gideon's motivations.

Reid is close to Jareau, Morgan, and Prentiss. Jareau asks him to be godfather to her newborn son Henry, and is one of the only two people on the team who calls him "Spence." It is implied in "Plain Sight" that Reid has a crush on Jareau, and Gideon even prods him to ask her out after giving him Washington Redskins football tickets for his birthday. No romance comes of it, but they do develop a close, sibling-like friendship. Reid is very protective of her, and often blames himself if she is injured, even if there was nothing he could have done to prevent it. In "Closing Time", after she is injured while arresting a suspect, Reid is seen counting her injuries as she sits in the ambulance and tells the paramedic that she should be going to get a CAT scan. Reid also has a brotherly friendship with Morgan. In season seven, he is comfortable enough to start a joke war with him, something that he probably would never do with anyone else, and he occasionally confides his secrets to Morgan. In the episode "Elephant's Memory", when approached by a fully armed suspect named Owen Savage (Cody Kasch), whom Reid identifies with, Reid gives Prentiss his gun and trusts her enough to back him up and not shoot at Savage as he tries to talk him down. Although not shown, it is implied Reid and Prentiss spend time together outside of work, along with riding the train home together when they return from cases. Prentiss is the only one who has beat Reid at poker, even correcting his statistic about her particular poker move. Reid and Prentiss are held hostage by a cult led by Benjamin Cyrus (Luke Perry). Though he is not injured, Reid struggles with guilt over "allowing" Prentiss' beating at the hands of Cyrus in "Minimal Loss". Reid later becomes close to Special Agent Alex Blake (Jeanne Tripplehorn), seeing her as a maternal figure, and occasionally guest-lecturing in her forensic linguistics class.

Reid contracts anthrax during an outbreak in Maryland, and is later shot in the leg protecting a doctor whose life is being threatened. (In reality, Gubler had injured his knee and the show's writers had written Reid getting shot into the show to explain why he spent subsequent episodes with his leg in a cast and using crutches.)

During "Corazon", Reid begins to develop severe headaches and hallucinations. He goes to see a doctor in order to find out the source of his headaches, but the doctor says there is no physical cause, and they may be psychosomatic. Reid refuses to believe this, afraid that he may have the same illness as his mother. It is not mentioned again until "Coda", when he is seen once again wearing sunglasses and is carrying a book on migraines. In the same episode, Reid bonds with a young autistic boy, Sammy Sparks. A cut line from the episode has David Rossi stating that Sammy and Reid are two of the most fascinating minds he has ever encountered. In the episode "Valhalla", Reid tells Prentiss about his headaches. By then, Reid has gone to several doctors, but no one has been able to diagnose what is wrong with him. He tells Prentiss that he has not told any of the team members because he is afraid that they will "make him feel like a baby."

In "Lauren", it is Reid and technical analyst Penelope Garcia (Kirsten Vangsness) who react most strongly to the news of Prentiss' death (they are unaware that she faked her death in order to enter the Witness Protection Program). Reid's reaction is to run out of the room, and he ends up sobbing into Jareau's shoulder, telling her that he "never got a chance to say goodbye." In season seven, when Prentiss returns and Reid discovers Hotchner and Jareau knew she wasn't dead, he is upset, especially with Jareau. He tells her he feels betrayed because he came to her house "for 10 weeks in a row, crying over losing a friend" and "not once did you have the decency to tell me the truth." She doesn't say anything.

In "True Genius", Reid doubts his reasons for being in the BAU and wonders if he should be doing more with his intellect. This is provoked by a suspect sending him taunting messages and challenging Reid to find him. In this episode, he also reveals that the team missed his 30th birthday. At the end of the episode, the team throws him a mini birthday party to celebrate.

Drug Addiction
In (Season 2, Episode 15) "Revelations", Tobias Hankel (James Van Der Beek), a psychotic serial killer, kidnaps Reid, drugging and torturing him over the course of two days before he is rescued. Reid is so traumatized that he develops an addiction to the narcotic painkiller Dilaudid. While the BAU team members have their suspicions about his addiction, none of them confront him about it. An old friend of Reid's in New Orleans is also aware that Reid suffers from "problems" in (Season 2, Episode 18) "Jones". They don't bring up the drug addiction for a while until he gets clean and attends a support group meeting for addicts in law enforcement in (Season 3, Episode 16) "Elephant's Memory".

At which he admits struggling with cravings as well as with traumatic memories, including a young adult suspect's shooting death in his presence. When he contracts anthrax in "Amplification", he strictly refused to take any narcotic painkillers in an attempt to remain clean. Memories of his torture under Hankel later allow him to empathize with other victims.

In (Season 7, Episode 2) "Proof", while arguing, Reid reveals to Jareau that he almost started taking Dilaudid again when he believed that Prentiss was dead.

Reid's addiction is mentioned one last time in the season 15 finale, when he has a seizure and has a hallucination of deceased serial killer George Foyet (C. Thomas Howell), who tauntingly calls Reid an addict.

Personal life
Throughout the series, Reid shows a lack of interest when interacting with women. The only few exceptions are Jennifer "JJ" Jareau; Lila Archer (Amber Heard), a young actress he is assigned to protect; Austin (Courtney Ford), a barmaid he "woos" with magic tricks while showing her a sketch of a potential suspect; Maeve Donovan (Beth Riesgraf), a geneticist he first meets through correspondence, then later weekly phone calls; Maxine "Max" Brenner (Rachael Leigh Cook). In "Memoriam", a prostitute hits on Reid in a Las Vegas casino, but he is oblivious to her intentions.

In "Somebody's Watching", with the team on a case to protect a TV starlet, Reid saves Lila from being harmed by a serial killer. Reid and Lila kindle a short-lived romance, beginning when Lila pulls Reid, fully clothed, into her pool for a kiss. At the end of the episode, they go their separate ways, and Lila is not seen in further episodes.

Reid meets Austin during an investigation of a serial killer who picks up his victims in bars. Reid is having trouble talking to the women in these clubs, especially since he is spouting facts about club-related deaths, but Morgan helps him out. Reid starts a conversation with Austin, who works at the bar, and proceeds to do a magic trick in which he appears to jab a pen through the eye of a police sketch, but pulls it through, leaving the paper unscathed. She expresses interest in him, and he gives her his business card in case she hears something about the killer. Later, she sees the killer, Robert Parker (Gabriel Olds), with another potential victim and intentionally spills her drink on the woman, pulling her away. Parker seems to disappear, and while Austin goes outside to phone Reid, he grabs her. The team responds quickly and saves her before she is harmed. At the end of the episode, she and Reid are talking over the phone, and he opens a package at his desk that contains the card that he gave her—with a lipstick kiss on the back.

In "God Complex", Reid begins calling Maeve - whose face and identity he does not know - on a payphone and they talk about his progress with his headaches and sleep deprivation. It is revealed that she is in danger and doesn't want someone to know about her and Reid. While on a case in New Mexico, Blake drops Reid off at a phone booth, unaware that he is going to call the mystery woman. Blake later returns and questions his motives. The two agents have a heated discussion, and he tells her the mystery woman is a geneticist he contacted about his headaches during season six, whom he believes can help on the case. Thanks to her, they are able to find the unsub and save his latest victim. At the end of the episode, Reid thanks her for her help and tells her that he and the BAU can help her in her situation. However, she refuses because she doesn't want him to hurt Reid. She ends the phone call by telling him that she loves him. Left shocked and speechless, he starts walking to his left but then turns around and walks to his right. Sometime after "The Lesson", Reid continues calling Maeve, eventually getting to know her. She tells Reid that her stalker might be gone and because of this, she wants to meet him. During a case in Arizona, Blake confronts him about "phone booth girl". Reid tells Blake that he's nervous to meet her because he already believes she's the most beautiful girl in the world, and he is afraid that she won't like him because of his looks. Blake encourages him to meet her. After Reid gets back from the case, they plan to meet at a fancy restaurant until Reid sees a man gazing over at him. Thinking him to be Maeve's stalker, Reid calls her to cancel while she is right outside. Spencer realizes that the man is not the stalker, and Maeve has already left. The hostess gives him a bag that she left for him. It turns out to be the very same book he was going to give to her by Sir Arthur Conan Doyle. Inside, she has written a quote by Thomas Merton; "Love is our true destiny. We do not find the meaning of life by ourselves alone. We find it with another."

In (Season 8, Episode 12) "Zugzwang", Reid discovers that Maeve has been kidnapped by her stalker. In the investigation, he meets Maeve's former fiancé Bobby Putnam (Jay Hayden), the man he believed to be her stalker. Reid becomes more and more distressed by the situation and discovers that her kidnapper is not Putnam, but his girlfriend, Diane Turner (Michelle Trachtenberg), who hates Maeve for rejecting her doctoral thesis. Reid searches for her, and even offers to take her place. He discovers that Turner wants attention from him and to be seen as an equal. He gets a clue from Turner leading him to her location, where he tricks her into believing that he is in love with her. Reid finally meets Maeve face-to-face during the situation and is able to briefly subdue Turner, only to have her hold Maeve at gunpoint. He once again offers to take Maeve's place, but Turner kills herself and Maeve with one shot.

Devastated by grief, Reid spends two weeks alone in his apartment after Maeve's death. The BAU team tries to help him, but he refuses to answer the door. While Reid remains at home, the team travels to another case. They call him for help a few times before he joins the team in person. Once the case is complete, Reid asks Morgan, Garcia, and Jareau to help clean up his apartment. He picks up The Narrative of John Smith (given to him by Maeve) with the Thomas Merton quote and places it on the bookshelf.

In the months following, Reid throws himself into his work when he is not able to sleep because of a recurring dream in which Maeve asks him to dance with her, but forces himself to wake up before he answers. By the end of "Alchemy", Reid is able to complete the dream by accepting Maeve's request to dance with her. In "The Inspiration", Reid admits that, had Maeve not died, he might have had children with her. In the season nine finale, it is revealed that he still carries a copy of The Narrative of John Smith in his bag.

Cat Adams (Aubrey Plaza), a serial killer who made her debut in Season 11, quickly becomes infatuated with Reid, seeing him as her only "worthy opponent". In Season 12, she creates an elaborate plan that ends with Reid being arrested and his mother being kidnapped. Reid interrogates Adams, who says she is pregnant with his child. The next time Adams emerges is in (Season 15, Episode 6) "Date Night", when she is about to be executed and wishes to see him. Instead of playing games as they have previously done, she wants to go on a date.

In "Truth or Dare", the Season 14 finale, Jareau confesses to Reid that she has loved him ever since they first met. Despite insisting that she only said it to distract a killer holding them hostage, Reid knows what she said is true but chooses not to dwell on it for the sake of their friendship. Season 15 opens up "Under the Skin" with Jareau being shot and clinging to life. At the hospital Reid admits to a sleeping Jareau that it does not matter if her feelings are true or not, he cannot imagine life without her. Jareau wakes up and eventually tells Reid that what she said was true, and that he will always be her first true love. Despite the shared love between the two, Jareau and Reid keep this a secret and remain best friends.

In season 15, Reid is given a task by his therapist to have a normal conversation with someone outside of work. He meets a woman named Maxine Brenner (Rachael Leigh Cook) in (Season 15, Episode 4) "Saturday". They plan to go on their third coffee date when Adams intervenes, holding Maxine's sister and father hostage. Adams makes Reid take her to his apartment, where Maxine is waiting and sees the two kiss. Adams attempts to drive a wedge between Reid and Maxine, but, in the end, her plan fails. The episode ends with Reid and Maxine kissing.

Maeve returns as a vision in the series finale (Season 15, Episode 10) "And in the End..." after Reid sustains a brain injury. Her primary role in Reid's mind was convincing him to finally choose a decision based not on what he thought others wanted, but based on what made him happy.

Development
Reid is 23 years old in the pilot episode, having joined the unit when he was 22. His fellow team members almost always introduce him as Dr. Reid. Hotchner reveals in the first season that Gideon insists on introducing him as Dr. Reid because Gideon fears that, because of his age, Reid will not be taken seriously as an FBI agent. This was a genuine concern, both for in-universe and for audience acceptance, since in real life the minimum age to become an FBI Special Agent is 23, with at least three more years to obtain Supervisory Special Agent status, and appointments to the BAU do not usually occur until after at least eight to ten years in the FBI. While filming the pilot, the show's FBI consultant informed Matthew Gray Gubler that there was nothing realistic about his character.

Before Gubler was cast in the role, the character was envisioned as more like Data from Star Trek. However, the producers liked Gubler's softer interpretation, despite telling the actor he was wrong for the part. After several callbacks, he was hired.

Gubler stated in an interview in the show's second season "[Reid]'s an eccentric genius, with hints of schizophrenia and minor autism." Writer Sharon Lee Watson stated in a Twitter chat that Reid's Asperger traits make the character more lovable.

Gubler has commented on the differences between Reid and the similarly eccentric character Penelope Garcia: "She represents everything he's not, she's very tech-oriented and I would like to imagine he is more like 1920s smart, books and reading etc". Kirsten Vangsness agreed, adding that Garcia is more extroverted and available emotionally, whereas Reid struggles with his emotions.

During October 2012, series creator Jeff Davis tweeted that Reid was originally envisioned to be bisexual, but the network shut the idea down by the fourth episode when Reid develops a crush on his colleague, Jennifer "JJ" Jareau.

References

External links
 Dr. Spencer Reid on IMDb

Criminal Minds characters
Fictional drug addicts
Fictional Behavioral Analysis Unit agents
Fictional characters from Las Vegas
Fictional writers
Fictional characters on the autism spectrum
Fictional characters with eidetic memory
Television characters introduced in 2005
American male characters in television
Fictional California Institute of Technology people
Fictional painkiller addicts
Fictional bibliophiles
Fictional people from the 20th-century